C/1890 V1 (Zona) is a non-periodic comet discovered on 15 November 1890 by the Italian astronomer Temistocle Zona with an equatorially mounted Merz telescope at the Osservatorio Astronomico di Palermo. Whilst attempting to observe this comet, Spitaler discovered the eponymous 113P/Spitaler in 1890.

References

External links 
 C/1890 V1 (Zona) – Applet Java

Non-periodic comets
1890 in science
18901115